Zou Yougen (Simplified Chinese: 邹侑根; born 25 February 1975) is a former Chinese international football midfielder, who represented Sichuan Quanxing, Xiamen Bluelion and Chengdu Blades where he achieved the distinction for being the first player to ever make over 300 appearances at the highest level of Chinese football as well as holding the record for the most appearances in the top flight of any professional Chinese footballer at the time.

Club career
Zou Yougen grew up in Chengdu, Sichuan where he joined the Sichuan Youth team. He was drafted into the senior side during the 1994 league season. This was the first season where the entire football league became fully professional and Zou quickly adapted to the higher demands of the league where, in his debut season, he made eight appearances and scored two goals. Because of his ability to play in several midfield positions, particularly within left-midfield, he quickly moved up from a squad regular to a vital member of the team by the 1996 league season at Sichuan Quanxing. With Sichuan he stayed with them throughout their highs and lows until the club disbanded before the start of the 2006 league season.

Without a club Zou joined recently promoted club Xiamen Bluelion who still had to buy his contract for 2 million RMB. With Xiamen he experienced a resurgence in his career and went on to score 10 league goals in his first season with Xiamen. The following season he could not prevent Xiamen from being relegated and he left for another promoted side Chengdu Blades as well as returning to his hometown of Chengdu. It was at this club that Zou played in his 300th league game and achieved being the most capped player in Chinese football to play in the top flight when he played a league game against Henan Construction on November 2, 2008 in a 0-0 draw. While Zou continued to add to his record, his time playing at the top flight ended when Chengdu Blades were relegated for match-fixing before the start of 2010 league season, Zou decided to stay loyal and remained with the club. Zou would only play a small part in the team's promotion and decide to retire with team mate Yao Xia at the end of the season.

See also
 List of football records in China

References

External links
 
 Zou's News at SINA (Chinese)
 

1975 births
Living people
Sportspeople from Chengdu
Chinese footballers
Footballers from Sichuan
China international footballers
Sichuan Guancheng players
Xiamen Blue Lions players
Chengdu Tiancheng F.C. players
Chinese Super League players
China League One players
Association football midfielders
21st-century Chinese people